Mitić is a Serbian surname. Notable people with the surname include:

Bogoljub Mitić, Serbian actor
Ilija Mitić, former Serbian American footballer
Boris Mitić, documentary film director
Gojko Mitić, Serbian director and actor
Rajko Mitić, Serbian footballer, one of the five Stars of Red Star Belgrade
Borislav Mitić, guitarist